Badih Chabaan (c. 1960 - 4 September 2017) was a PR councilor in the Cape Town City Council (Subcouncil 17 (Athlone & District)). He was a member of the Africa Muslim Party (AMP) when he was named councilor in August 2006 but later crossed the floor to establish the National People's Party (NPP), which he led as president.  In November 2015, he announced his intention to resign from politics and hand over NPP leadership to his daughter.

Chabaan was controversial for both his role in floor crossing politics within Cape Town politics and for the lease he held on trading in Greenmarket Square. For 15 years from 1992 to 2007, he held a lease on 83% of the square and owed the city R3.3 million. His lease was cancelled in 2007 amid accusations of mismanagement, racketeering and corruption.

Chabaan died on 4 September 2017.

External links
 ID CHALLENGE ZILLE OVER APPOINTMENT OF NEW COUNCILLOR BADIH CHAABAN
 Battle hots up over the future of Greenmarket square
  Dyantyi orders fresh probe against Badih
  'Zille instigated probe into Badih Chaaban'

References 

1960s births
2017 deaths
Politicians from Cape Town
Africa Muslim Party politicians